Ann Lee (29 February 1736 – 8 September 1784), commonly known as Mother Ann Lee, was the founding leader of the United Society of Believers in Christ's Second Appearing, or the Shakers.

After nearly two decades of participation in a religious movement that became the Shakers, in 1774 Ann Lee and a small group of her followers emigrated from England to New York. After several years, they gathered at Niskayuna, renting land from the Manor of Rensselaerswyck, Albany County, New York (the area now called Colonie). They worshiped by ecstatic dancing or "shaking", which resulted in them being dubbed the Shakers. Ann Lee preached to the public and led the Shaker church at a time when few women were religious leaders.

Early history

Ann Lee was born in Manchester, England, and was baptized privately at Manchester Collegiate Church (now Manchester Cathedral) on 1 June 1742, at the age of 6. Her parents were members of a distinct branch of the Society of Friends and too poor to afford their children even the rudiments of education. Ann Lee's father, John Lees, was a blacksmith during the day and a tailor at night. It is probable that Ann Lee's original surname was Lees, but somewhere through time it changed to Lee. Little is known about her mother other than that she was a very religious woman. As often happened in those days, the mother's name was not even recorded. When Ann was young, she worked in a cotton factory, then as a cutter of hatter's fur, and later as a cook in a Manchester infirmary.

In 1758, she joined an English sect founded by Jane Wardley and her husband, preacher James Wardley; this was the precursor to the Shaker sect. She believed and taught her followers that it is possible to attain perfect holiness by giving up sexual relations. Like her predecessors, the Wardleys, she taught that the shaking and trembling were caused by sin being purged from the body by the power of the Holy Spirit, purifying the worshiper.

Beginning during her youth, Ann Lee was uncomfortable with sexuality, especially her own. This repulsion towards sexual activity continued and manifested itself in her repeated attempts to avoid marriage. Eventually her father forced her to marry Abraham Stanley (or Abraham Standarin). They were married on 5 January 1761 at Manchester Collegiate Church. She became pregnant four times, but all of her children died during infancy. Her difficult pregnancies and the loss of four children were traumatic experiences that contributed to Ann Lee's dislike of sexual relations. Lee developed radical religious convictions that advocated celibacy and the abandonment of marriage, as well as the importance of pursuing perfection in every facet of life. She differed from the Quakers, who, though they supported gender equality, did not believe in forbidding sexuality within marriage.

Rise to prominence
In England, Ann Lee rose to prominence by urging other believers to preach more publicly concerning the imminent second coming, and to attack sin more boldly and unconventionally. She spoke of visions and messages from God, claiming that she had received in a vision from God the message that celibacy and confession of sin are the only true road to salvation and the only way in which the Kingdom of God could be established on the earth. She was frequently imprisoned for breaking the Sabbath by dancing and shouting, and for blasphemy.

She claimed to have had many miraculous escapes from death. She told of being examined by four clergymen of the Established Church, claiming that she spoke to them for four hours in 72 tongues.

While in prison in Manchester for 14 days, she said she had a revelation that "a complete cross against the lusts of generation, added to a full and explicit confession, before witnesses, of all the sins committed under its influence, was the only possible remedy and means of salvation." After this, probably in 1770, she was chosen by the Society as "Mother in spiritual things" and called herself "Ann, the Word" and also "Mother Ann." After being released from prison a second time, witnesses say Mother Ann performed a number of miracles, including healing the sick.

Lee eventually decided to leave England for America in order to escape the persecution (i.e., multiple arrests and stays in prison) she experienced in Great Britain.

Move to America

In 1774 a revelation led her to take a select band to America. She was accompanied by her husband, who soon afterwards deserted her. Also following her to America were her brother, William Lee (1740–1784); Nancy Lee, her niece; James Whittaker (1751–1787), who had been brought up by Mother Ann and was probably related to her; John Hocknell (1723–1799), who provided the funds for the trip; his son, Richard; James Shepherd; and Mary Partington. Mother Ann and her converts arrived on 6 August 1774 in New York City, where they stayed for nearly five years. In 1779 Hocknell leased land at Niskayuna in the township of Watervliet, near Albany. The Shakers settled there, and a unique community life began to develop and thrive.

During the American Revolution, Lee and her followers maintained a stance of neutrality. Maintaining the position that they were pacifists, Ann Lee and her followers did not side with either the British or the colonists.

Ann Lee opened her testimony to the world's people on the famous Dark Day in May 1780, when the sun disappeared and it was so dark that candles had to be lighted to see indoors at noon. She soon recruited a number of followers who had joined the New Light revival at New Lebanon, New York, in 1779, including Lucy Wright.

Beginning in the spring of 1781, Mother Ann and some of her followers went on an extensive missionary journey to find converts in Massachusetts and Connecticut. They often stayed in the homes of local sympathizers, such as the Benjamin Osborn House near the New York-Massachusetts line. There were also songs attributed to her which were sung without words.

The followers of Mother Ann came to believe that she embodied all the perfections of God in female form and was revealed as the "second coming" of Christ. The fact that Ann Lee was considered to be Christ's female counterpart was unique. She preached that sinfulness could be avoided not only by treating men and women equally but also by keeping them separated so as to prevent any sort of temptation leading to impure acts. Celibacy and confession of sin were essential for salvation.

Ann Lee's mission throughout New England was especially successful in converting groups who were already outside the mainstream of New England Protestantism, including followers of Shadrack Ireland. To the mainstream, however, she was too radical for comfort. Ann Lee herself recognized how revolutionary her ideas were when she said, "We [the Shakers] are the people who turned the world upside down."

The Shakers were sometimes met by violent mobs, such as in Shirley, Massachusetts, and Ann Lee suffered violence at their hands more than once. Because of these hardships Mother Ann became quite frail; she died on 8 September 1784 at the age of 48.

She died at Watervliet and is buried in the Shaker cemetery located in the Watervliet Shaker Historic District.

It is claimed that Shakers in New Lebanon, New York, experienced a 10-year period of revelations in 1837 called the Era of Manifestations. It was also referred to as Mother Ann's Work.

Cultural legacy

Ann Lee is memorialized in:

 Judy Chicago's The Dinner Party
 the (afterword of the) novel A Maggot
 A song, "The Heart Of Ann Lee", on the 2010 album All This Longing by English folk singer-songwriter Reg Meuross

See also
 Millennial Praises
 the Public Universal Friend, contemporary leader of another new religious movement
 List of people who have claimed to be Jesus

References

Further reading
Campion, Nardi Reeder.  Mother Ann Lee: Morning Star of the Shakers Publisher: UPNE.  1990.  
Francis, Richard (2000). Ann the Word : the story of Ann Lee, female messiah, mother of the Shakers, the woman clothed with the sun. New York : Arcade Pub. : Distributed by Time Warner 
Hall, Roger Lee. Invitation to Zion: A Shaker Music Guide. Publisher: PineTree Press, 2017.
Stein, Stephen J. The Shaker Experience in America: A History of the United Society of Believers (Yale University Press, 1992).

External links

1736 births
1784 deaths
18th-century apocalypticists
British emigrants to the Thirteen Colonies
English Christian religious leaders
American Christian religious leaders
Clergy from Manchester
18th-century Christian mystics
18th-century English people
18th-century American people
People of the Province of New York
Doctrine and Covenants people
People from Niskayuna, New York
People from New Lebanon, New York
Female religious leaders
18th-century religious leaders
English Shaker missionaries
Female Christian missionaries
Founders of religions
Deified women
Women mystics
Sexual abstinence and religion